Sindaebang Station is a station on Seoul Subway Line 2. A BRT line serving the Nangok district of Sillim-dong will transfer to Line 2 at this station in a few years.

Station layout

References

Railway stations opened in 1984
Seoul Metropolitan Subway stations
Metro stations in Dongjak District
1984 establishments in South Korea
20th-century architecture in South Korea